Johan Sandberg (born 12 May 1970) is a Swedish former professional tennis player.

Born in Malmö, Sandberg was a third ranked junior in Sweden and played collegiate tennis for the University of South Carolina (USC) from 1990 to 1994. His doubles partnership with José Frontera ranked five in the country, which was a USC record. In 1994 he earned All-American honours for singles. Following college he competed briefly on the international tour and featured in the qualifying draw at the 1995 Wimbledon Championships.

References

External links
 
 

1970 births
Living people
Swedish male tennis players
South Carolina Gamecocks men's tennis players
Sportspeople from Malmö
20th-century Swedish people